The following is a list of paintings by the 17th century French painter Valentin de Boulogne.

Paintings by Valentin de Boulogne

See also 
Valentin de Boulogne

References

Boulogne, Valentin de